Dynit Srl is one of the main Italian manga and anime publishers. Its head office is in the Cadriano frazione in Granarolo dell'Emilia, Province of Bologna.

It was founded in 1995 by Francesco Di Sanzo, Claudia Cangini, Francesco Bombardini, Paolo Nascetti, Saetti Srl and Federico Colpi and its original name was Dynamic Italia Srl. The name was changed following a litigation between Colpi and then-president Francesco Di Sanzo, who later founded Shin Vision. All anime and manga published by Dynit are translated in Italian. Many of their anime have been published in VHS and DVD; also they have been broadcast by the Italian television channels MTV, Rai Due, Disney Channel and Rai 4. Federico Colpi left the company in 2002 after further litigation with the company's new management.

List of anime
A Letter to Momo
Aika
Akira
Alexander
Alexander The Movie
Angel Sanctuary
Ano Hana
Armitage III
Armitage III
Armitage III: Poly Matrix
Arzak Rhapsody
Attack on Titan
Bakemonogatari
Beck
Black Rock Shooter
Blue Submarine No. 6
Blocker Gundan 4 Machine Blaster
Boogiepop Phantom
Boys Be
Brain Powered
Casshan
Charmmy Kitty
Chi's Sweet Home
Ceres, Celestial Legend
City Hunter
Code Geass: Lelouch of the Rebellion
Code Geass: Akito the Exiled
Coppelion
Cosmowarrior Zero
Cowboy Bebop
Cyber City Oedo 808
Dai-Guard
Daitarn 3
Daltanious
Dance in the Vampire Bund
Day Break Illusion
Deadman Wonderland
Death Note
Demon City Shinjuku
Dennou Coil
Devil Lady
Diebuster
Dragon Ball
Digimon
Eatman
Ergo Proxy
Eureka Seven
Evangelion: 1.0 You Are (Not) Alone
Evangelion: 2.0 You Can (Not) Advance
Evangelion: 3.0 You Can (Not) Redo
Excel Saga
Fate/stay night: Unlimited Blade Works
Fire Force DNA Sights 999.9
FLCL
Full Metal Panic!: The Second Raid
Fullmetal Alchemist
Fullmetal Alchemist Brotherhood
Full Moon o Sagashite
Fushigi Yūgi
Future Boy Conan
Gals!
Gatchaman Crowds
Garden of Words
Gear Fighter Dendoh
Generator Gawl
Ghost in the Shell
Ghost in the Shell: Innocence
Ghost in the Shell 2.0
Ghost in the Shell: Stand Alone Complex
Ghost in the Shell: Stand Alone Complex The 2nd GIG
Ghost in the Shell: Stand Alone Complex Solid State Society
Ghost in the Shell: Arise
Gintama (Ep. 1-49)
Golden Boy
Groizer X
Great Teacher Onizuka
Gunbuster
Gurren Lagann: Childhood's End
Gurren Lagann: The Lights in the Sky are Stars
Hand Maid May
Hurricane Polymar
Kaiba
InuYasha
InuYasha The Final Act
Kakurenbo
Kare Kano
Kill la Kill
Last Exile
Lovely Complex
Mahoujin Guru Guru
Mao Dante
Mawaru Penguindrum
My Hero Academia
Nana
Neon Genesis Evangelion (the company became known to NGE fans for releasing the show uncut and uncensored with great success in Italy, considering its controversial content)
Neon Genesis Evangelion: Death & Rebirth
Noein
Oh My Goddess!
One Punch Man
Owarimonogatari
Owari no Seraph 
Panda kopanda
Paul no Miracle Daisakusen
Pet Shop of Horrors
Ping Pong The Animation
Platinumhugen Ordian
Prison School
Psycho-Pass
Psycho-Pass 2
 Pretty Cure
Puella Magi Madoka Magica
Puella Magi Madoka Magica: The Movie (Beginning, Eternal, Rebellion)
Ranma ½
Rurouni Kenshin
Sakura Mail
Sailor Moon
Saiyuki
Serial Experiments Lain
Shinkai Densetsu Meremanoid
Silver Spoon
Someone's Gaze
Soul Eater
Soul Eater Not!
Soul Taker
Space Dandy
Star Blazers: Space Battleship Yamato 2199
Steins;Gate
Strange Dawn
Sugarbunnies
Sword Art Online
Sword Art Online Extra Edition
Sword Art Online II
Sword of the Stranger
Tenchi Muyo!
Tengen Toppa Gurren Lagann
Terra Formars
The End of Evangelion
 The Melancholy of Haruhi Suzumiya
The Vision of Escaflowne
Toradora!
Tokyo Ghoul
Trider G7
Trigun
Trigun: Badlands Rumble
Violence Jack
Yōkai Ningen Bem
Wicked City
Wolf Children
X/1999
Zambot 3

List of manga
Apocalypse Zero
Bad Company
Be Free
Beck
Black Jack
Cowboy Bebop
Deadman
Devilman
Emma
Excel Saga
Fatal Fury 2
Fruits Basket
Gals!
Genei Musou
Getter Robot G
Getter Robot Saga
Golden Boy
Goldrake
Great Teacher Onizuka
Guru Guru
Hanakimi
Hellsing
Jeeg
Kare Kano
Kodocha
Kugutsu
Let's Draw Manga
Love + Dessin
Mao Dante
Mazinsaga
Pretty
Record of Lodoss War
Revolutionary Girl Utena
Saiyuki
Shadow Hearts
Shonan Junai Gumi
Super Doll Rika Chan
Trigun
Violence Jack
Yotsuba&!

References

External links

Dynit official website

Comic book publishing companies of Italy
Manga distributors
Publishing companies established in 1995